The Rt Rev Russel Featherstone Brown (also spelled Russell; 7 January 1900 - 7 January 1988) was an eminent Anglican  priest, who became the eighth Bishop of Quebec.  Educated at Bishop's University, Lennoxville and ordained in 1933, his first post was a curacy at  Christ Church Cathedral, Montreal. After this he was Priest in Charge of Fort St. John, British Columbia and then Rector of Sherbrooke until 1954 when he became Archdeacon of Quebec - a post he held until his elevation to the episcopate. After 11 years he resigned to teach in Papua New Guinea. From 1976 he was an assistant bishop of Montreal.  In 2008 a memorial Holy Trinity Anglican Cathedral was unveiled in his honour.

References

1900 births
1988 deaths
People from Newcastle upon Tyne
Bishop's University alumni
Anglican archdeacons in North America
Anglican bishops of Quebec
20th-century Anglican Church of Canada bishops
English emigrants to Canada
Anglophone Quebec people